Lemnaphila is a genus of duckweed miner flies in the family Ephydridae.

Species
L. grossoae Mathis & Edmiston, 2000
L. lilloana Lizarralde de Grosso, 1978
L. lillolana Lizarralde de Grosso, 1978
L. longicera Mathis & Edmiston, 2000
L. neotropica Lizarralde de Grosso, 1977
L. scotlandae Cresson, 1933
L. wirthi Lizarralde de Grosso, 1977

References

Ephydridae
Ephydroidea genera
Diptera of North America
Diptera of South America
Taxa named by Ezra Townsend Cresson